The Last Frontier is a 1955 American Western film directed by Anthony Mann and starring Victor Mature, Guy Madison, Robert Preston, and Anne Bancroft. The film is set during the American Civil War at an isolated army base at the far reaches of the American frontier, where the Indians still far outnumber the whites.

The Last Frontier was filmed in Technicolor and CinemaScope. On television, it has been shown retitled as Savage Wilderness.

Plot
Trapper Jed Cooper (Victor Mature) and his two best friends Gus (James Whitmore) and Mungo (Pat Hogan) are relieved of their possessions by some unfriendly Indians, so they seek shelter at a nearby army fort, commanded by Captain Riordan (Guy Madison). The captain recruits the three men as scouts. Also at the fort is Corrina Marston (Anne Bancroft), waiting for her missing husband, Colonel Frank Marston (Robert Preston).

Jed quickly falls in love with Mrs. Marston, sensing her ambivalence about her husband; when the colonel returns, he is revealed to be an unmitigated tyrant. Colonel Marston is driven to redeem himself after a disastrous battle at Shiloh, where over a thousand of his men were killed unnecessarily. Marston wants to attack the regional Indian chief, Red Cloud, believing this will restore his good name and return him to the battle back east. He ignores the fact that most of the men at the fort are raw recruits, hopelessly outnumbered and completely unprepared for the vicious fighting they will face with the Indians. Jed is faced with the decision of letting Marston go on with his mad scheme, or finding a way to do away with him.

Cast
 Victor Mature as Jed Cooper
 Guy Madison as Captain Glenn Riordan
 Robert Preston as Colonel Frank Marston
 James Whitmore as Gus
 Anne Bancroft as Corinna Marston
 Russell Collins as Captain Phil Clarke
 Peter Whitney as Sergeant Major Decker
 Pat Hogan as Mungo

Production
The film was originally known as The Gilded Rooster, the title of the 1947 novel on which the script was based. Film rights were acquired by Columbia in 1953. Marlon Brando was sought for the title role. The role was eventually given to Victor Mature who had just signed a two-picture deal with Columbia.

Filming was to have started in January 1955 but this was pushed back, in part so Mature could make Violent Saturday. Production began 21 March 1955 on location in Mexico.

Yordan says he rewrote the film coming up with the theme that the Mature character wanted to get into the army so he could woo a woman. "That's the whole picture—about a guy trying to get a blue uniform", he said.

See also
List of American films of 1955

References

External links 
 
 
 
 

1955 films
1950s English-language films
1955 Western (genre) films
CinemaScope films
American Western (genre) films
Western (genre) cavalry films
Films directed by Anthony Mann
American Civil War films
Films based on American novels
Films scored by Leigh Harline
1950s American films